Hugo Emilio Soto Miranda (born September 28, 1983) is a Colombian footballer who plays for Zamora in the Venezuelan league.  His usual position is central defender

Honours

Player
La Equidad
Copa Colombia (2008)

See also
Football in Colombia
List of football clubs in Colombia

References

External links
Profile at BDFA.com.ar

1983 births
Living people
Sportspeople from Cartagena, Colombia
Colombian footballers
Atlético Nacional footballers
La Equidad footballers
Atlético Huila footballers
Zamora FC players
Colombian expatriate footballers
Expatriate footballers in Venezuela
Association football defenders
21st-century Colombian people